Moor Pool (or Moorpool) is a  garden suburb within the ward of Harborne, Birmingham, England. It was designated a Conservation Area in July 1970, which was raised by an Article 4(2) direction order in 2006. A Conservation Area Character Appraisal and Management Plan was adopted in March 2012.

History

The Moor Pool estate was established in 1907 by John Sutton Nettlefold, who was part of the Guest Keen Nettlefold (GKN) family. It formed part of the Garden City concept, shared by George Cadbury in Bournville, to create low density housing with many interspersed green spaces, and community facilities. The estate was built with a community hall (complete with skittle alley and snooker tables), two tennis clubs, a bowling green, numerous allotments, and the Moor Pool (pond) itself; all of these facilities remain today for residents' use.

The homes and buildings were designed by William Martin, an architect known for working with John Henry Chamberlain to build 41 of the Birmingham board schools (including the nearby Harborne Clock Tower / School Yard), through their practice Martin & Chamberlain.

Moor Pool Heritage Trust
In 2014 the residential landlord of the estate, Grainger plc planned to sell off the local amenities, including the hall, the bowling green, tennis courts, skittle alley, fishing pond, some open space and shops. The Moor Pool Heritage Trust made a deal with Grainger to acquire the community facilities for £325,000. After a fundraiser, which included a £98,900 Heritage Lottery Fund grant, the acquisition was completed on 14 December 2014.

Nettlefold Pocket Park
In 2016 it was announced that Moor Pool Heritage Trust had been awarded over £8,500 to create a pocket park on an overgrown site on the corner of Margaret Grove and Moor Pool Avenue. The name Nettlefold Garden was chosen (after a naming competition), to reflect the heritage of the Moor Pool estate. The park was officially opened to the public by Cllr Carl Rice, the Lord Mayor of Birmingham, on 21 May 2017.

Listed Buildings

Key

Buildings

References

External links 
 Moor Pool Heritage Trust
 Moor Pool Residents' Association

Areas of Birmingham, West Midlands
Garden suburbs
Populated places established in 1907
Conservation areas in England
Harborne